Kennedy Peak is a  peak in the Tedim Township of the Chin State of Burma (Myanmar) that dominates the Tedim Road. It is one of the world's ultra-prominent peaks, as it rises 4,951 feet (more than 1500 m) above all other peaks nearby.  It is the second highest mountain in Chin State, next to Mount Victoria.

It was the site of a battle during World War II in which Ram Sarup Singh, a subedar of the British Indian army, led his unit with great bravery in attacking and capturing a strong Japanese-held position, then persisting despite wounds in defending it against counterattacks, until killed.  He was posthumously awarded the Victoria Cross.

See also
 List of Ultras of Southeast Asia
 Geography of Burma

References

External links
 "Kennedy Peak, Myanmar" on Peakbagger

Chin State
Mountains of Myanmar